The Copa Santiago de Futebol Juvenil, formerly known as Torneio Romeu Goulart Jacques, is an under-17 football tournament played on annual basis in the Brazilian city of Santiago, Rio Grande do Sul. Entrant teams usually include Brazilian and foreign clubs, mostly from Mercosur countries.

The first edition occurred in 1989, promoted by Cruzeiro Esporte Clube, a local team that focuses on youth football. In 1993, the tournament was recognized by the Brazilian Football Confederation and, in 1994, by FIFA. In the same year, China's national U-17 team was the first non-South American side to take part in the competition.

In 2006, all matches were played at Estádio Alceu Carvalho.

List of champions

Titles by team
Internacional 14 titles
Grêmio 7 titles
Cruzeiro 2 titles
Nacional (Uruguay) 2 titles
Atlético Mineiro 1 title
Cruzeiro de Santiago 1 title
Fluminense 1 title
Independiente del Valle 1 title
Matsubara 1 title
Palmeiras 1 title

External links
Official Website

Youth football competitions in Brazil
Santiago de Futebol Juvenil
Under-17 association football